Boy For Rent (Boy For Rent – ) is a 2019 Thai television series starring Sananthachat Thanapatpisal (Fon), Sarunchana Apisamaimongkol (Aye), Tanutchai Wijitwongthong (Mond) and Thanat Lowkhunsombat (Lee).

Directed by Ekkasit Trakulkasemsuk and produced by GMMTV together with Keng Kwang Kang, the series was one of the thirteen television series for 2019 launched by GMMTV in their "Wonder Th13teen" event on 5 November 2018. It premiered on One31 and LINE TV on 10 May 2019, airing on Fridays at 21:45 ICT (previously at 22:00 ICT for the first episode) and 23:00 ICT, respectively. The series concluded on 2 August 2019.

Since 1 June 2020, the series was rerun on GMM 25 airing on Mondays and Tuesdays at 22:45 ICT.

Cast and characters 
Below are the cast of the series:

Main 
 Sananthachat Thanapatpisal (Fon) as Smile
 Sarunchana Apisamaimongkol (Aye) as Liz
 Tanutchai Wijitwongthong (Mond) as Badz
 Thanat Lowkhunsombat (Lee) as Kyro

Supporting 
 Apichaya Saejung (Ciize) as Onnie
 Sutthipha Kongnawdee (Noon) as Tam
 Jirakit Kuariyakul (Toptap) as Tan
 Chatchawit Techarukpong (Victor) as Jayden
 Suttatip Wutchaipradit (Ampere) as Jenny

Guest role 
 Wanwimol Jensawamethee (June) as Badz's young sister
 Nutchapon Rattanamongkol (Nut)
 Sarunthorn Klaiudom (Mean) as Run

Soundtracks

References

External links 
 Boy For Rent on One31 website 
 Boy For Rent on GMM 25 website 
 Boy For Rent on LINE TV
 
 GMMTV

Television series by GMMTV
Thai romantic comedy television series
Thai drama television series
2019 Thai television series debuts
2019 Thai television series endings
One 31 original programming
Television series by Keng Kwang Kang